"Erase/Rewind" is a song written by Peter Svensson and Nina Persson for the Cardigans' fourth studio album, Gran Turismo (1998). The song is the album's second track and was released as its second single in 1999, reaching number three in Iceland, number seven in Italy and the United Kingdom, and number 12 in Sweden. It was featured in the 1999 film The Thirteenth Floor during the ending credits. It was also featured in the 1999 film Never Been Kissed when Josie (Drew Barrymore) dances with her prom date Guy (Jeremy Jordan).

Critical reception
Birmingham Evening Mail wrote, "The Swedish five-piece decrease the tempo slightly for this lilting ballad which is not quite as catchy as 'My Favourite Game' - which spent a massive three months in the UK top 40 - but should still confirm the band as being back in the big time."

Music video
The official music video was directed by Swedish director Adam Berg. It features science-fiction references to Star Wars and 2001: A Space Odyssey.<ref>Henry Keazor/Thorsten Wuebbena: Video Thrills the Radio Star, Bielefeld 2011³, p. 129/140.</ref>

At least three versions of the video exist. In one version, the walls which close on the band while performing nearly crush them before a camera pointing at them shuts down. Another version shows the walls stopping and a door opening in front of them. A variant of the latter shows several clips from The Thirteenth Floor during the video.

The music video contains an Easter egg in braille; the title, "Erase/Rewind" is encoded on the wall in yellow dots, with "Ut" in Swedish, or out, above the door.

At the end of the video, the band members begin to destroy their musical instruments.

Credits and personnel
 Vocals: Nina Persson
 Guitar: Peter Svensson
 Bass: Magnus Sveningsson
 Keyboard: Lars-Olof Johansson
 Drums: Bengt Lagerberg
 Recorded at Country Hell, Tambourine Studios, Skurup, Sweden
 Producer: Tore Johansson
 Engineer: Tore Johansson, Janne Waldenmark
 Assistant engineer: Lars Göransson
 Audio mixing: Tore Johansson
 Mixing assistant: Jim Caruana
 Mastering by: Björn Engelmann Cutting Room Studios

Charts

Release history

Cover versions
In 2008, Italian singer Sabrina Salerno released her dance version of this song as the lead single for her double album Erase/Rewind Official Remix''.

References

External links
The Cardigans' official website

1998 songs
1999 singles
The Cardigans songs
Polydor Records singles
Sabrina Salerno songs
Songs written by Nina Persson
Songs written by Peter Svensson
Stockholm Records singles